That's Enough of That is the debut studio album by American country music artist Mila Mason. It was released in 1996 (see 1996 in country music) on Atlantic Records Nashville. It was produced by Blake Mevis.

The album produced three hit singles, all three of which charted both the Billboard Hot Country Singles & Tracks (now Hot Country Songs) charts and the Canadian RPM country charts. "That's Enough of That", the first, reached number 18 in the US and number 30 in Canada. "Dark Horse" was originally recorded by its co-writer, Amanda Marshall, on her self-titled debut album. Her version was a number 12 on the RPM Top Singles charts in 1996, while Mason's version was a number 21 country hit in the US and number 12 country hit in Canada. "That's the Kinda Love (That I'm Talkin' About)", the final single, was number 59 in the US and 66 in Canada.

Track listing

Personnel
From liner notes.
Larry Byrom – slide guitar
Mark Casstevens – acoustic guitar
Glen Duncan – fiddle
Sonny Garrish – pedal steel guitar
John Hobbs – keyboards
Christopher James – background vocals
David James – background vocals
Kirk "Jelly Roll" Johnson – harmonica
Liana Manis – background vocals
Brent Mason – electric guitar
Mila Mason – lead vocals
Matt Rollings – piano, keyboards
Billy Joe Walker, Jr. – acoustic guitar
Lonnie Wilson – drums
Glenn Worf – bass guitar

Chart performance

References

 

1996 debut albums
Atlantic Records albums
Mila Mason albums